"The One I Love" is a song by American alternative rock band R.E.M. It was released on the band's fifth full-length studio album, Document, and also as a 7" vinyl single in 1987. The song was their first hit single, reaching No. 9 on the US Billboard Hot 100, No. 14 in Canada, and later reached No. 16 on the UK Singles Chart in its 1991 re-release. 

The accompanying video's director was artist Robert Longo. The director of photography was Alton Brown, who later became a Food Network personality.

In March 2005, Q magazine placed "The One I Love" at No. 57 in its list of the 100 Greatest Guitar Tracks. In 2012, Slant Magazine listed the song as the 38th best single of the 1980s.

The song is included on R.E.M. Live (2007). It was also included in Activision's Guitar Hero World Tour and Guitar Hero on Tour: Decades, both in 2008, as well as Harmonix's Rock Band 4 (2015).

Lyrics and meaning
The record has become a popular radio dedication to loved ones, relying on a misinterpretation of its refrain, "This one goes out to the one I love." However, subsequent lyrics in the same verse contradict the love song interpretation and suggest a darker, more manipulative theme ("A simple prop to occupy my time").

Stipe related in 1987 to Rolling Stone, "I've always left myself pretty open to interpretation. It's probably better that they just think it's a love song at this point." However, in an interview in the January 1988 issue of Musician magazine, he said that the song was "incredibly violent"  and added, "It's very clear that it's about using people over and over again".

The song contains only three verses, the first two of which are identical; the third verse changes the line "A simple prop to occupy my time" to "Another prop has occupied my time." The chorus consists of just the word "fire", repeated over the backing vocal of "She's coming down on her own now / Coming down on her own" (sung by Mike Mills).

Track listing
All songs written by Bill Berry, Peter Buck, Mike Mills and Michael Stipe unless otherwise indicated.

 "The One I Love" – 3:16
 "Maps and Legends" (Live)1 – 3:15

12": IRS / IRS-23792 (US) 
Side one
 "The One I Love" – 3:16

Side two
 "The One I Love" (Live)1 – 4:06
 "Maps and Legends" (Live)1 – 3:15

12": IRS / IRMT 146 (UK) 
Side one
 "The One I Love" – 3:16

Side two
 "Last Date" (Floyd Cramer) – 2:16
 "Disturbance at the Heron House"1 – 3:26

1987 CD: IRS / DIRM 146 (UK) 
 "The One I Love" – 3:16
 "Last Date" (Floyd Cramer) – 2:16
 "Disturbance at the Heron House"1 – 3:26

1988 CD: IRS / DIRM 173 (UK) 
 "The One I Love" – 3:16
 "Fall on Me" – 2:50
 "So. Central Rain" – 3:14

1991 Limited Edition CD: IRS / DIRMT 178 (UK) 
 "The One I Love" – 3:16
 "This One Goes Out" (Live) – 4:01
 "Maps and Legends" (Live) – 3:13

1991 Limited Edition CD: IRS / DIRMX 178 (UK) 
 "The One I Love" – 3:15
 "Driver Eight" (Live) – 3:27
 "Disturbance at the Heron House" (Live) – 3:40
 "Crazy" – 3:02

1 Recorded at McCabe's Guitar Shop, Santa Monica, California, May 24, 1987.

Certain releases list the live recording of "The One I Love" as "This One Goes Out" instead.

Charts

References

External links
Video clip at REMhq.com
2020 interview with Bertis Downs on the song

1987 songs
1987 singles
R.E.M. songs
Songs written by Bill Berry
Songs written by Peter Buck
Songs written by Mike Mills
Songs written by Michael Stipe
I.R.S. Records singles
Song recordings produced by Scott Litt
Song recordings produced by Mike Mills
Song recordings produced by Michael Stipe
Song recordings produced by Peter Buck
Song recordings produced by Bill Berry
American new wave songs